The Jogesh Chandra Chaudhuri Law College (abbreviated as JCCLC) is a Government Sponsored Law College in south Kolkata offering degree courses in law. It is affiliated with the  University of Calcutta.

Notable alumni
Hon’ble Justice Bhaskar Bhattacharya Former Chief Justice of Gujarat High Court.
Hon’ble Justice Pranab Kumar Chatterjee, Former acting Chief Justice of Calcutta High Court & Chairman, West Bengal Law Commission @@@
Hon’ble Justice Jayanta Kumar Biswas, Former Judge of Calcutta High Court.
Hon’ble Justice Jyotirmoy Bhattacharya, Judge of Calcutta High Court.
Hon’ble Justice Ashok Kumar Dasadhikary, Former Judge of Calcutta High Court.
Hon'ble Justice Mir Dara Sheko, Former Judge of Calcutta High Court.
Mamata Banerjee, Chief Minister of West Bengal
Saugata Roy, Member of Parliament (Lok Sabha).
Partha Chatterjee, Minister-in-Charge, Department of Higher Education, Parliamentary Affairs and School Education Department, West Bengal.
Moloy Ghatak, Minister-in-Charge, Department of Law, Judicial Affairs, Labour and E.S.I., Government of West Bengal
Sovan Chatterjee, Former Mayor of Kolkata and Minister-in-Charge, Department of Housing, Environment, Fire & Emergency Services, Government of West Bengal
Firhad Hakim, Mayor of Kolkata and Minister-in-Charge, Department of Municipal Affairs, Urban Development, Fire & Emergency Services Government of West Bengal

See also 
Jogesh Chandra Chaudhuri College
List of colleges affiliated to the University of Calcutta
Education in West Bengal

References

External links

University of Calcutta affiliates
Law schools in West Bengal
Educational institutions established in 1970
1970 establishments in West Bengal